Karula may refer to several places in Estonia:

Karula, Lääne-Viru County, village in Vihula Parish, Lääne-Viru County
Karula, Valga County village in Karula Parish, Valga County
Karula, Viljandi County, village in Saarepeedi Parish, Viljandi County
Karula National Park in southern Estonia
Karula Parish, municipality in Valga County
Karula Upland in southern Estonia

See also

Karola